Carnival in the Tropics (Spanish: Carnaval en el trópico), also known in Spanish as Fiesta en Veracruz (English: "Holiday in Veracruz") is a 1942 Mexican comedy film written and directed by Carlos Villatoro. Although the film was released in other countries in 1942, it wasn't released in Mexico until 1946 due to copyright disputes.

The film's art direction was by Ramón Rodríguez Granada.

Plot
Plácido (Agustín Isunza) and his wife Mercedes "Meche" (Eufrosina García) are two merchants who long to go to the carnivals in Veracruz, the problem is that they do not have enough money to attend. To do this, they decide to convince the lender Homobono (Manuel Medel) to finance the trip. There, the three friends experience adventures in which they spend all their money.

Cast
Óscar Alatorre
Cantinflas 
Roberto Cañedo
Edmundo Espino
Carlos Max García
Eufrosina García as Mercedes "Meche"
Ana María González
Rafael Hernández
Chino Ibarra
Agustín Isunza as Plácido
Gustavo López
Diana Macklen
Manuel Medel as Homobono
José Elías Moreno	
Rayito de Oro
Gabriel Ruiz
Estanislao Schillinsky
Roberto Soto
David Valle González

Production
The film was shot in Veracruz in 1940 and 1941. The film contained footage showing Cantinflas performing bullfights and performing on the Xalapa Carnival stage. Villatoro also used material from the Cantinflas short film Cantinflas boxeador. This footage was used without the prior permission of Cantinflas, who took legal action,  which delayed the release of the film in Mexico until 1946.

References

Bibliography
Rodríguez, Rolando. Cantinflas, torero. Clío, 1995. 
Garcia Berumen, Frank Javier. Brown Celluloid: Latino/a Film Icons and Images in the Hollywood Film Industry, Volume I (1894–1959). Vantage Press, 2003. 
García Riera, Emilio. Historia documental del cine mexicano: 1941. Ediciones Era, 1969.
Wilt, David E. The Mexican Filmography: 1916 through 2001. McFarland & Co Inc, Jefferson NC 2004.

External links

1942 comedy films
1942 films
Mexican comedy films
Mexican black-and-white films
1940s Mexican films